Noel Vernon Cyril Turner (12 May 1887 – 13 June 1941) was an English first-class cricketer active 1906–12 who played for Nottinghamshire. He was born in Langley Mill; died in Hungerford. Turner also played football, as a goalkeeper for Corinthian, and in 1920 played in an amateur international match for England against Belgium.

References

1887 births
1941 deaths
English cricketers
Nottinghamshire cricketers
Free Foresters cricketers
Association football goalkeepers
Corinthian F.C. players
English footballers